1165 Imprinetta, provisional designation , is a carbonaceous Meliboean asteroid from the outer regions of the asteroid belt, approximately  in diameter. It was discovered on 24 April 1930 by Dutch astronomer Hendrik van Gent at the Union Observatory in Johannesburg, South Africa. The asteroid was named after Imprinetta Gent, wife of the discoverer.

Orbit and classification 
Imprinetta is a member of the Meliboea family, a smaller asteroid family of carbonaceous outer-belt asteroids with a few hundred members, named after 137 Meliboea.

This asteroid orbits the Sun in the outer main-belt at a distance of 2.5–3.8 AU once every 5 years and 6 months (2,017 days). Its orbit has an eccentricity of 0.21 and an inclination of 13° with respect to the ecliptic.

Physical characteristics 
Imprinetta has been characterized as a carbonaceous C-type asteroid by PanSTARRS photometric survey, which corresponds with the overall spectral type of the Meliboea family.

Rotation period 
In October 2003, a rotational lightcurve of Imprinetta was obtained from photometric observations by American John Menke at his observatory in Barnesville, Maryland. Lightcurve analysis gave a well-defined rotation period of 8.107 hours with a brightness variation of 0.20 magnitude. An alternative observation gave a lightcurve with period of 7.9374 hours and an amplitude of 0.20 magnitude.

Diameter and albedo 

The Collaborative Asteroid Lightcurve Link derives an albedo of 0.0392 and a diameter of  based on an absolute magnitude of 10.7.

Naming 
This minor planet was named after Imprinetta Gent, wife of the discoverer. The naming was proposed by the discoverer and by Gerrit Pels, who computed its orbit. The official naming citation was mentioned in The Names of the Minor Planets by Paul Herget in 1955.

References

External links 
 Asteroid Lightcurve Database (LCDB), query form (info )
 Dictionary of Minor Planet Names, Google books
 Asteroids and comets rotation curves, CdR – Observatoire de Genève, Raoul Behrend
 Discovery Circumstances: Numbered Minor Planets (1)-(5000) – Minor Planet Center
 
 

001165
Discoveries by Hendrik van Gent
Named minor planets
19300424